Alan Thomas Sorrell (born 23 May 1923 – 4 April 2011) was an Australian rules footballer who played with the Carlton Football Club and Fitzroy Football Club in the Victorian Football League (VFL).

Notes

External links 

Alan Sorrell's profile at Blueseum

1923 births
2011 deaths
Carlton Football Club players
Fitzroy Football Club players
Melbourne High School Old Boys Football Club players
Australian rules footballers from Melbourne
People from Ivanhoe, Victoria